The John and Mary Pappajohn Sculpture Park is a  park within Western Gateway Park in Des Moines, Iowa. It opened in 2009 with 24 sculptures, with four more acquired later. The sculpture park is administered by the Des Moines Art Center and contains works by artists such as Louise Bourgeois, Jaume Plensa, Ai Weiwei, and Barry Flanagan. It is considered "one of the most significant collections of outdoor sculptures in the United States".

History 

The park is named for John Pappajohn, a local venture capitalist and his wife Mary Louise Pappajohn (1933-2022), who gifted the initial 24 sculptures, with a valuation of about $40 million USD, to the city of Des Moines. The couple are recognized art collectors, appearing in the ARTnews list of top 200 art collectors from 1998 to 2014. The first sculptures donated for the park were originally part of the Pappajohn's private collection, and located in their yard. Before they were moved to Western Gateway Park, people used to drive by their home to look at the art.

Diana Agrest and Mario Gandelsonas, two New York based architects, designed the landscape with grassy mounds and parabolic-shaped cutaways. These cutouts create walled-in spaces used to display the sculptures in groups of related artistic styles.

The Pappajohn sculpture park was the capstone of the broad redevelopment project that revitalized downtown Des Moines. In the early 2000s, the west end of downtown Des Moines was in a dilapidated state, with auto repair shops, seedy businesses, and worn out and vacant buildings. The city decided to remediate the situation and created Western Gateway park from 10th to 15th street, demolishing derelict buildings and moving an historic apartment complex to another site. Development of Western Gateway and the addition of the sculpture park enhanced the real estate value and drove new investments to the area. At its inauguration in 2009, the sculpture park was an optimistic counterpoint to the Great Recession, and to the destruction across Iowa caused by floods and tornadoes the previous year.

In 2011, White ghost by Yoshitomo Nara was installed in the park, after being exhibited in New York, as public art placed near the entrances to the Asia Society and the Park Avenue Armory. 

The Des Moines Art Center was the 2017 recipient of the Art Conservation Project grant from Bank of America, given for the restoration of Keith Haring's Untitled (Three Dancing Figures, version C). The sculpture was structurally sound, but the paint coating had deteriorated from years of outdoor public display.

In 2018, Pumpkin Large by Japanese artist Yayoi Kusama was installed in the park. The bronze pumpkin is about 8 feet high, including a 3-foot pedestal. The surface has a pattern of recessed dots of different sizes, going all the way up to the stem. According to Jeff Fleming, director of the Des Moines Art Center, the piece is a “definitive work by one of the most important contemporary artists working today”.

A version of Robert Indiana's iconic LOVE sculpture was placed in the park in 2019.

Sculptures

List of artwork 
Currently there are 28 sculptures in the park:

Reclining figure (1982) by Willem de Kooning
Gymnast III (1985) by William G. Tucker
Untitled (1985) by Joel Shapiro
In the morning (1986) by Anthony Caro
Five plate pentagon (1986) by Richard Serra
T8 (1987) by Mark Di Suvero
Juno (1989) and Ancient Forest (2009) by Deborah Butterfield
Marriage (1989) by Tony Smith
Order (1989) by Tony Cragg
Decoy (1990) by Martin Puryear
Post Balzac (1990) by Judith Shea
Seating for eight (1990) and Café Table 1 (1992) by Scott Burton
Untitled (1994) by Ellsworth Kelly
Thinker on a Rock (1997) by Barry Flanagan
Spider (1997) by Louise Bourgeois
LOVE (1999) by Robert Indiana
Back of a Snowman (black) (2002) and Back of Snowman (white) (2002) by Gary Hume
Willy (2005) by Tony Smith
Moonrise.east.january (2005) and Moonrise.east.august (2006) by Ugo Rondinone
air gets into everything even nothing (2006) by Ugo Rondinone
Nomade (2007) by Jaume Plensa
Untitled (Three Dancing Figures, version C) (2009) by Keith Haring
White Ghost (2010) by Yoshitomo Nara
Panoramic Awareness pavilion (2013) by Olafur Eliasson
Iron tree trunk (2015) by Ai Weiwei
Pumpkin Large (2018) by Yayoi Kusama

Selected works

Nomade (2007) by Jaume Plensa 
One of the most arresting and iconic pieces in the Pappajohn Sculpture Park is Nomade by Spanish sculptor Jaume Plensa, which dominates the landscape over Locust Street. The sculpture was originally exhibited in 2007, in the then newly restored Saint-Jaume bastion, in Antibes. Subsequently, the sculpture was acquired by Mary and John Pappajohn in Miami, while the city of Antibes Juan-les-Pins ordered a similar work by Plensa to be installed there permanently.

The sculpture is hollow and visitors can walk inside to look through the spaces between the letters. This work exemplifies Plensa's exploration of communication issues between individuals or cultures, as well as his interest in literature and the human body. The letters do not form meaningful words, but rather express the symbolic essence of language. In a Des Moines Register poll about 75 percent of the people surveyed chose Nomade as the piece they most connected with.

See also 
List of sculpture parks

References

External links 
John and Mary Pappajohn Sculpture Park, Des Moines Art Center

Sculpture gardens, trails and parks in the United States
Urban public parks
Parks in Iowa
Tourist attractions in Des Moines, Iowa
Geography of Des Moines, Iowa